Baily is the remnant of a lunar impact crater on the boundary between Mare Frigoris to the north and Lacus Mortis to the south. The crater interior has been flooded by lava in the past, and only the northern half of the crater rim remains relatively intact. There is an outward bulge in the northeastern rim, possibly the remnant of another crater formation that once overlapped Baily. The crater interior is flat and relatively featureless, with no impacts of significance. The surviving outer rim reaches a maximum elevation of about 0.5 km.

The nearest crater of note is Bürg to the south-southwest. Further to the west is the prominent Aristoteles.

Satellite craters
By convention these features are identified on lunar maps by placing the letter on the side of the crater midpoint that is closest to Baily.

References

External links
 

Impact craters on the Moon